HMS Vox (P73) was a Royal Navy V-class submarine that served in the latter part of World War II, from 1943 to 1946, before it was scrapped at Cochin. An earlier HMS Vox had been transferred to France as Curie.

History 

Vox was laid down by Vickers–Armstrong on 19 December 1942, and was intended as a replacement for another submarine of the same name, which, upon completion, had been given into French service. The ship was launched on 28 September 1943, and was commissioned on 20 December.

Vox participated alongside Vivid in exercises against Vigorous late in the day.

On 3 and 4 July 1944, while patrolling off the coast of Greece, Vox sank two sailing vessels off Monernvassia and one German sailing vessel off Santorini. On 1 August, Vox claimed to have sunk a sailing vessel, and on 3 August it fired two torpedoes at an auxiliary patrol vessel, though both torpedoes missed.

On 12 February 1945, Vox was put on to the slipway at Fremantle, and on 13 February was put back on the water. She was subsequently used in anti-submarine training until her scrapping in October 1946 at Cochin.

References 

1943 ships
Royal Navy Submarine Service